Hymenodria is a monotypic moth genus in the family Geometridae erected by James Halliday McDunnough in 1954. Its only species, Hymenodria mediodentata, was first described by William Barnes and McDunnough in 1911. It is found in North America.

The MONA or Hodges number for Hymenodria mediodentata is 7278.

References

Further reading

 
 
 
 
 
 
 
 
 
 

Hydriomenini
Articles created by Qbugbot
Moths described in 1911
Monotypic moth genera
Taxa named by James Halliday McDunnough